Room Inside the World is the third and final studio album by Canadian art punk band, Ought. The album was released on February 16, 2018, through Merge Records.

Critical reception 

Room Inside the World received critical acclaim upon its release. At Metacritic, which assigns a normalized rating out of 100 to reviews from mainstream publications, the album received an average score of 81, based on 19 reviews, indicating "universal acclaim".

Track listing

Personnel 
The following individuals were credited on the album:

 Greg Calbi – mastering
 Choir! Choir! Choir! – vocals
 Eamon Cuinn – clarinet
 Tim Darcy – composition, guitar, vocals
 Erin Lawlor – artwork
 Steve Fallone – mastering
 James Goddard – saxophone
 Tim Keen – composition, drums, synthesizer, vibraphone, viola
 Matt May – composition
 Matt May – guitar, keyboards, synthesizer
 Daniel Murphy – design
 Ben Stidworthy – bass, composition
 Nicolas Vernhes – guitar, keyboards, mixing, noise, production
 Gabe Wax – engineering

Charts

Accolades

References

External links 
 Room Inside the World

2018 albums
Ought (band) albums
Merge Records albums
Post-punk albums by Canadian artists